Pierluigi Benedettini (born August 18, 1961) is a Sammarinese former footballer who played as a goalkeeper. Like other players from San Marino, he was an amateur and worked as a bus driver. 

He is the father of Simone who became also International goalkeeper in 2019, and the uncle of Elia.

Benedetti made 25 appearances for the San Marino national team from 1990 to 1995. In 1992, Benedettini conceded 10 goals for San Marino against Norway in the World Cup Qualification European section Group 2 match at the Ullevall stadium in Oslo.

References

1961 births
Living people
Sammarinese footballers
San Marino international footballers
Association football goalkeepers